Strophanthus is a genus of flowering plants in the family Apocynaceae, first described as a genus in 1802. It is native primarily to tropical Africa, extending to South Africa, with a few species in Asia from southern India to New Guinea and southern China. The genus name is a compound of the Greek words στροφος (strophos) "twisted" and ανθοσ (anthos) "flower", in reference to the corolla lobes which, in some species - notably S. petersianus (see below) - resemble long twisted ribbons or threads and can reach a length of 30–35 cm. This trait, in addition to colouring involving combinations of bright pinks, purples and oranges, combine to make the flowers among the most ornamental in the plant kingdom.

The genus includes vines, shrubs, and small trees. The leaves are opposite or whorled, simple broad lanceolate, 2–20 cm long, with an entire margin.

Several African tribes used Strophanthus as the principal ingredient in arrow poison. After dipping the arrows of their hunting weapons into a strong concentration of the ingredient, the effect was to stun their prey.

Plants from this genus produce toxic alkaloids and cardiac glycosides g-strophanthin (syn. ouabain), k-strophanthin, and e-strophanthin. As ordinarily administered, the drug acts on the heart before influencing any other organ or tissue. Indeed, often no other effect may be observed. Some of the chemicals in the plants are used to produce the drug ouabain, which was taken as a cardiac stimulant to treat heart failure and sometimes g-strophanthin is advocated as an alternative treatment to more contemporary practices. The effect is similar to that of the drug digoxin, which is produced from Digitalis purpurea.

Gallery

Flowers

Species

formerly included in genus
 Strophanthus aambe = Papuechites aambe  
 Strophanthus balansae = Anodendron paniculatum
 Strophanthus jackianus = Wrightia dubia

References

External links

 
Apocynaceae genera
Poisonous plants